Gold (79Au) has one stable isotope, 197Au, and 36 radioisotopes, with 195Au being the most stable with a half-life of 186 days. Gold is currently considered the heaviest monoisotopic element. Bismuth formerly held that distinction until alpha-decay of the 209Bi isotope was observed. All isotopes of gold are either radioactive or, in the case of 197Au, observationally stable, meaning that 197Au is predicted to be radioactive but no actual decay has been observed.

List of isotopes 

|-
| 169Au
| style="text-align:right" | 79
| style="text-align:right" | 90
| 168.99808(32)#
| 150# μs
|
|
| 1/2+#
|
|
|-
| 170Au
| style="text-align:right" | 79
| style="text-align:right" | 91
| 169.99612(22)#
| 310(50) μs[286(+50−40) μs]
|
|
| (2−)
|
|
|-
| style="text-indent:1em" | 170mAu
| colspan="3" style="text-indent:2em" | 275(14) keV
| 630(60) μs[0.62(+6−5) ms]
|
|
| (9+)
|
|
|-
| rowspan=2|171Au
| rowspan=2 style="text-align:right" | 79
| rowspan=2 style="text-align:right" | 92
| rowspan=2|170.991879(28)
| rowspan=2|30(5) μs
| p
| 170Pt
| rowspan=2|(1/2+)
| rowspan=2|
| rowspan=2|
|-
| α (rare)
| 167Ir
|-
| rowspan=2 style="text-indent:1em" | 171mAu
| rowspan=2 colspan="3" style="text-indent:2em" | 250(16) keV
| rowspan=2|1.014(19) ms
| α (54%)
| 167Ir
| rowspan=2|11/2−
| rowspan=2|
| rowspan=2|
|-
| p (46%)
| 170Pt
|-
| rowspan=2|172Au
| rowspan=2 style="text-align:right" | 79
| rowspan=2 style="text-align:right" | 93
| rowspan=2|171.99004(17)#
| rowspan=2|4.7(11) ms
| α (98%)
| 168Ir
| rowspan=2|high
| rowspan=2|
| rowspan=2|
|-
| p (2%)
| 171Pt
|-
| rowspan=2|173Au
| rowspan=2 style="text-align:right" | 79
| rowspan=2 style="text-align:right" | 94
| rowspan=2|172.986237(28)
| rowspan=2|25(1) ms
| α
| 169Ir
| rowspan=2|(1/2+)
| rowspan=2|
| rowspan=2|
|-
| β+ (rare)
| 173Pt
|-
| rowspan=2 style="text-indent:1em" | 173mAu
| rowspan=2 colspan="3" style="text-indent:2em" | 214(23) keV
| rowspan=2|14.0(9) ms
| α (96%)
| 169Ir
| rowspan=2|(11/2−)
| rowspan=2|
| rowspan=2|
|-
| β+ (4%)
| 173Pt
|-
| rowspan=2|174Au
| rowspan=2 style="text-align:right" | 79
| rowspan=2 style="text-align:right" | 95
| rowspan=2|173.98476(11)#
| rowspan=2|139(3) ms
| α
| 170Ir
| rowspan=2|low
| rowspan=2|
| rowspan=2|
|-
| β+ (rare)
| 174Pt
|-
| style="text-indent:1em" | 174mAu
| colspan="3" style="text-indent:2em" | 360(70)# keV
| 171(29) ms
|
|
| high
|
|
|-
| rowspan=2|175Au
| rowspan=2 style="text-align:right" | 79
| rowspan=2 style="text-align:right" | 96
| rowspan=2|174.98127(5)
| rowspan=2|100# ms
| α (82%)
| 171Ir
| rowspan=2|1/2+#
| rowspan=2|
| rowspan=2|
|-
| β+ (18%)
| 175Pt
|-
| rowspan=2 style="text-indent:1em" | 175mAu
| rowspan=2 colspan="3" style="text-indent:2em" | 200(30)# keV
| rowspan=2|156(3) ms
| α
| 171Ir
| rowspan=2|11/2−#
| rowspan=2|
| rowspan=2|
|-
| β+
| 175Pt
|-
| rowspan=2|176Au
| rowspan=2 style="text-align:right" | 79
| rowspan=2 style="text-align:right" | 97
| rowspan=2|175.98010(11)#
| rowspan=2|1.08(17) s[0.84(+17−14) s]
| α (60%)
| 172Ir
| rowspan=2|(5−)
| rowspan=2|
| rowspan=2|
|-
| β+ (40%)
| 176Pt
|-
| style="text-indent:1em" | 176mAu
| colspan="3" style="text-indent:2em" | 150(100)# keV
| 860(160) ms
|
|
| (7+)
|
|
|-
| rowspan=2|177Au
| rowspan=2 style="text-align:right" | 79
| rowspan=2 style="text-align:right" | 98
| rowspan=2|176.976865(14)
| rowspan=2|1.462(32) s
| β+ (60%)
| 177Pt
| rowspan=2|(1/2+, 3/2+)
| rowspan=2|
| rowspan=2|
|-
| α (40%)
| 173Ir
|-
| style="text-indent:1em" | 177mAu
| colspan="3" style="text-indent:2em" | 216(26) keV
| 1.180(12) s
|
|
| 11/2−
|
|
|-
| rowspan=2|178Au
| rowspan=2 style="text-align:right" | 79
| rowspan=2 style="text-align:right" | 99
| rowspan=2|177.97603(6)
| rowspan=2|2.6(5) s
| β+ (60%)
| 178Pt
| rowspan=2|
| rowspan=2|
| rowspan=2|
|-
| α (40%)
| 174Ir
|-
| rowspan=2|179Au
| rowspan=2 style="text-align:right" | 79
| rowspan=2 style="text-align:right" | 100
| rowspan=2|178.973213(18)
| rowspan=2|7.1(3) s
| β+ (78%)
| 179Pt
| rowspan=2|5/2−#
| rowspan=2|
| rowspan=2|
|-
| α (22%)
| 175Ir
|-
| style="text-indent:1em" | 179mAu
| colspan="3" style="text-indent:2em" | 99(16) keV
|
|
|
| (11/2−)
|
|
|-
| rowspan=2|180Au
| rowspan=2 style="text-align:right" | 79
| rowspan=2 style="text-align:right" | 101
| rowspan=2|179.972521(23)
| rowspan=2|8.1(3) s
| β+ (98.2%)
| 180Pt
| rowspan=2|
| rowspan=2|
| rowspan=2|
|-
| α (1.8%)
| 176Ir
|-
| rowspan=2|181Au
| rowspan=2 style="text-align:right" | 79
| rowspan=2 style="text-align:right" | 102
| rowspan=2|180.970079(21)
| rowspan=2|13.7(14) s
| β+ (97.3%)
| 181Pt
| rowspan=2|(3/2−)
| rowspan=2|
| rowspan=2|
|-
| α (2.7%)
| 177Ir
|-
| rowspan=2|182Au
| rowspan=2 style="text-align:right" | 79
| rowspan=2 style="text-align:right" | 103
| rowspan=2|181.969618(22)
| rowspan=2|15.5(4) s
| β+ (99.87%)
| 182Pt
| rowspan=2|(2+)
| rowspan=2|
| rowspan=2|
|-
| α (.13%)
| 178Ir
|-
| rowspan=2|183Au
| rowspan=2 style="text-align:right" | 79
| rowspan=2 style="text-align:right" | 104
| rowspan=2|182.967593(11)
| rowspan=2|42.8(10) s
| β+ (99.2%)
| 183Pt
| rowspan=2|(5/2)−
| rowspan=2|
| rowspan=2|
|-
| α (.8%)
| 179Ir
|-
| style="text-indent:1em" | 183m1Au
| colspan="3" style="text-indent:2em" | 73.3(4) keV
| >1 μs
|
|
| (1/2)+
|
|
|-
| style="text-indent:1em" | 183m2Au
| colspan="3" style="text-indent:2em" | 230.6(6) keV
| <1 μs
|
|
| (11/2)−
|
|
|-
| 184Au
| style="text-align:right" | 79
| style="text-align:right" | 105
| 183.967452(24)
| 20.6(9) s
| β+
| 184Pt
| 5+
|
|
|-
| rowspan=3 style="text-indent:1em" | 184mAu
| rowspan=3 colspan="3" style="text-indent:2em" | 68.46(1) keV
| rowspan=3|47.6(14) s
| β+ (70%)
| 184Pt
| rowspan=3|2+
| rowspan=3|
| rowspan=3|
|-
| IT (30%)
| 184Au
|-
| α (.013%)
| 180Ir
|-
| rowspan=2|185Au
| rowspan=2 style="text-align:right" | 79
| rowspan=2 style="text-align:right" | 106
| rowspan=2|184.965789(28)
| rowspan=2|4.25(6) min
| β+ (99.74%)
| 185Pt
| rowspan=2|5/2−
| rowspan=2|
| rowspan=2|
|-
| α (.26%)
| 181Ir
|-
| style="text-indent:1em" | 185mAu
| colspan="3" style="text-indent:2em" | 100(100)# keV
| 6.8(3) min
|
|
| 1/2+#
|
|
|-
| rowspan=2|186Au
| rowspan=2 style="text-align:right" | 79
| rowspan=2 style="text-align:right" | 107
| rowspan=2|185.965953(23)
| rowspan=2|10.7(5) min
| β+ (99.9992%)
| 186Pt
| rowspan=2|3−
| rowspan=2|
| rowspan=2|
|-
| α (8×10−4%)
| 182Ir
|-
| style="text-indent:1em" | 186mAu
| colspan="3" style="text-indent:2em" | 227.77(7) keV
| 110(10) ns
|
|
| 2+
|
|
|-
| rowspan=2|187Au
| rowspan=2 style="text-align:right" | 79
| rowspan=2 style="text-align:right" | 108
| rowspan=2|186.964568(27)
| rowspan=2|8.4(3) min
| β+ (99.997%)
| 187Pt
| rowspan=2|1/2+
| rowspan=2|
| rowspan=2|
|-
| α (.003%)
| 183Ir
|-
| style="text-indent:1em" | 187mAu
| colspan="3" style="text-indent:2em" | 120.51(16) keV
| 2.3(1) s
| IT
| 187Au
| 9/2−
|
|
|-
| 188Au
| style="text-align:right" | 79
| style="text-align:right" | 109
| 187.965324(22)
| 8.84(6) min
| β+
| 188Pt
| 1(−)
|
|
|-
| rowspan=2|189Au
| rowspan=2 style="text-align:right" | 79
| rowspan=2 style="text-align:right" | 110
| rowspan=2|188.963948(22)
| rowspan=2|28.7(3) min
| β+ (99.9997%)
| 189Pt
| rowspan=2|1/2+
| rowspan=2|
| rowspan=2|
|-
| α (3×10−4%)
| 185Ir
|-
| rowspan=2 style="text-indent:1em" | 189m1Au
| rowspan=2 colspan="3" style="text-indent:2em" | 247.23(16) keV
| rowspan=2|4.59(11) min
| β+
| 189Pt
| rowspan=2|11/2−
| rowspan=2|
| rowspan=2|
|-
| IT (rare)
| 189Au
|-
| style="text-indent:1em" | 189m2Au
| colspan="3" style="text-indent:2em" | 325.11(16) keV
| 190(15) ns
|
|
| 9/2−
|
|
|-
| style="text-indent:1em" | 189m3Au
| colspan="3" style="text-indent:2em" | 2554.7(12) keV
| 242(10) ns
|
|
| 31/2+
|
|
|-
| rowspan=2|190Au
| rowspan=2 style="text-align:right" | 79
| rowspan=2 style="text-align:right" | 111
| rowspan=2|189.964700(17)
| rowspan=2|42.8(10) min
| β+
| 190Pt
| rowspan=2|1−
| rowspan=2|
| rowspan=2|
|-
| α (10−6%)
| 186Ir
|-
| rowspan=2 style="text-indent:1em" | 190mAu
| rowspan=2 colspan="3" style="text-indent:2em" | 200(150)# keV
| rowspan=2|125(20) ms
| IT
| 190Au
| rowspan=2|11−#
| rowspan=2|
| rowspan=2|
|-
| β+ (rare)
| 190Pt
|-
| 191Au
| style="text-align:right" | 79
| style="text-align:right" | 112
| 190.96370(4)
| 3.18(8) h
| β+
| 191Pt
| 3/2+
|
|
|-
| style="text-indent:1em" | 191m1Au
| colspan="3" style="text-indent:2em" | 266.2(5) keV
| 920(110) ms
| IT
| 191Au
| (11/2−)
|
|
|-
| style="text-indent:1em" | 191m2Au
| colspan="3" style="text-indent:2em" | 2490(1) keV
| >400 ns
|
|
|
|
|
|-
| 192Au
| style="text-align:right" | 79
| style="text-align:right" | 113
| 191.964813(17)
| 4.94(9) h
| β+
| 192Pt
| 1−
|
|
|-
| style="text-indent:1em" | 192m1Au
| colspan="3" style="text-indent:2em" | 135.41(25) keV
| 29 ms
| IT
| 192Au
| (5#)+
|
|
|-
| style="text-indent:1em" | 192m2Au
| colspan="3" style="text-indent:2em" | 431.6(5) keV
| 160(20) ms
|
|
| (11−)
|
|
|-
| rowspan=2|193Au
| rowspan=2 style="text-align:right" | 79
| rowspan=2 style="text-align:right" | 114
| rowspan=2|192.964150(11)
| rowspan=2|17.65(15) h
| β+ (100%)
| 193Pt
| rowspan=2|3/2+
| rowspan=2|
| rowspan=2|
|-
| α (10−5%)
| 189Ir
|-
| rowspan=2 style="text-indent:1em" | 193m1Au
| rowspan=2 colspan="3" style="text-indent:2em" | 290.19(3) keV
| rowspan=2|3.9(3) s
| IT (99.97%)
| 193Au
| rowspan=2|11/2−
| rowspan=2|
| rowspan=2|
|-
| β+ (.03%)
| 193Pt
|-
| style="text-indent:1em" | 193m2Au
| colspan="3" style="text-indent:2em" | 2486.5(6) keV
| 150(50) ns
|
|
| (31/2+)
|
|
|-
| 194Au
| style="text-align:right" | 79
| style="text-align:right" | 115
| 193.965365(11)
| 38.02(10) h
| β+
| 194Pt
| 1−
|
|
|-
| style="text-indent:1em" | 194m1Au
| colspan="3" style="text-indent:2em" | 107.4(5) keV
| 600(8) ms
| IT
| 194Au
| (5+)
|
|
|-
| style="text-indent:1em" | 194m2Au
| colspan="3" style="text-indent:2em" | 475.8(6) keV
| 420(10) ms
|
|
| (11−)
|
|
|-
| 195Au
| style="text-align:right" | 79
| style="text-align:right" | 116
| 194.9650346(14)
| 186.098(47) d
| EC
| 195Pt
| 3/2+
|
|
|-
| style="text-indent:1em" | 195mAu
| colspan="3" style="text-indent:2em" | 318.58(4) keV
| 30.5(2) s
| IT
| 195Au
| 11/2−
|
|
|-
| rowspan=2|196Au
| rowspan=2 style="text-align:right" | 79
| rowspan=2 style="text-align:right" | 117
| rowspan=2|195.966570(3)
| rowspan=2|6.1669(6) d
| EC (93.05%)
| 196Pt
| rowspan=2|2−
| rowspan=2|
| rowspan=2|
|-
| β− (6.95%)
| 196Hg
|-
| style="text-indent:1em" | 196m1Au
| colspan="3" style="text-indent:2em" | 84.660(20) keV
| 8.1(2) s
| IT
| 196Au
| 5+
|
|
|-
| style="text-indent:1em" | 196m2Au
| colspan="3" style="text-indent:2em" | 595.66(4) keV
| 9.6(1) h
|
|
| 12−
|
|
|-
| 197Au
| style="text-align:right" | 79
| style="text-align:right" | 118
| 196.9665687(6)
| colspan=3 align=center|Observationally Stable
| 3/2+
| 1.0000
|
|-
| style="text-indent:1em" | 197mAu
| colspan="3" style="text-indent:2em" | 409.15(8) keV
| 7.73(6) s
| IT
| 197Au
| 11/2−
|
|
|-
| 198Au
| style="text-align:right" | 79
| style="text-align:right" | 119
| 197.9682423(6)
| 2.69517(21) d
| β−
| 198Hg
| 2−
|
|
|-
| style="text-indent:1em" | 198m1Au
| colspan="3" style="text-indent:2em" | 312.2200(20) keV
| 124(4) ns
|
|
| 5+
|
|
|-
| style="text-indent:1em" | 198m2Au
| colspan="3" style="text-indent:2em" | 811.7(15) keV
| 2.27(2) d
| IT
| 198Au
| (12−)
|
|
|-
| 199Au
| style="text-align:right" | 79
| style="text-align:right" | 120
| 198.9687652(6)
| 3.139(7) d
| β−
| 199Hg
| 3/2+
|
|
|-
| style="text-indent:1em" | 199mAu
| colspan="3" style="text-indent:2em" | 548.9368(21) keV
| 440(30) μs
|
|
| (11/2)−
|
|
|-
| 200Au
| style="text-align:right" | 79
| style="text-align:right" | 121
| 199.97073(5)
| 48.4(3) min
| β−
| 200Hg
| 1(−)
|
|
|-
| rowspan=2 style="text-indent:1em" | 200mAu
| rowspan=2 colspan="3" style="text-indent:2em" | 970(70) keV
| rowspan=2|18.7(5) h
| β− (82%)
| 200Hg
| rowspan=2|12−
| rowspan=2|
| rowspan=2|
|-
| IT (18%)
| 200Au
|-
| 201Au
| style="text-align:right" | 79
| style="text-align:right" | 122
| 200.971657(3)
| 26(1) min
| β−
| 201Hg
| 3/2+
|
|
|-
| style="text-indent:1em" | 201m1Au
| colspan="3" style="text-indent:2em" | 594(5) keV
| 730(630) μs
|
|
| (11/2-)
|
|
|-
| style="text-indent:1em" | 201m2Au
| colspan="3" style="text-indent:2em" | 1610(5) keV
| 5.6(2.4) μs
|
|
| (11/2-)
|
|
|-
| 202Au
| style="text-align:right" | 79
| style="text-align:right" | 123
| 201.97381(18)
| 28.8(19) s
| β−
| 202Hg
| (1−)
|
|
|-
| 203Au
| style="text-align:right" | 79
| style="text-align:right" | 124
| 202.975155(3)
| 60(6) s
| β−
| 203Hg
| 3/2+
|
|
|-
| style="text-indent:1em" | 203mAu
| colspan="3" style="text-indent:2em" | 641(3) keV
| 140(44) μs
| IT
| 203Au
| 11/2−#
|
|
|-
| 204Au
| style="text-align:right" | 79
| style="text-align:right" | 125
| 203.97772(22)#
| 38.3(1.3) s
| β−
| 204Hg
| (2−)
|
|
|-
| style="text-indent:1em" | 204mAu
| colspan="3" style="text-indent:2em" | 3816(1000)# keV
| 2.1(0.3) μs
| IT
| 204Au
| 16+#
|
|
|-
| 205Au
| style="text-align:right" | 79
| style="text-align:right" | 126
| 204.97985(21)#
| 32.5(1.4) s
| β−
| 205Hg
| 3/2+#
|
|
|-
| style="text-indent:1em" | 205m1Au
| colspan="3" style="text-indent:2em" | 907(5) keV
| 6(2) s
|
|
| 11/2−#
|
|
|-
| style="text-indent:1em" | 205m2Au
| colspan="3" style="text-indent:2em" | 2850(5) keV
| 163(5) ns
|
|
| 19/2+#
|
|
|-
| 206Au
| style="text-align:right" | 79
| style="text-align:right" | 127
| 205.98474(32)#
| 47(11) s
| β−
| 206Hg
| (5+, 6+)
|
|

References 

 Isotope masses from:

 Isotopic compositions and standard atomic masses from:

 Half-life, spin, and isomer data selected from the following sources.

 
Gold
Gold